R32 may refer to:

Automobiles
 BMW R32, a motorcycle
 Nissan Skyline (R32), a mid-size car
 Nissan Skyline GT-R (R32), a sports car
 Volkswagen Golf Mk4 R32, a 2003 compact car
 Volkswagen Golf Mk5 R32, a 2005 compact car

Other uses 
 R32 (airship), of the Royal Navy
 R32 (New York City Subway car)
 1... R-32 opening, a shogi opening
 Difluoromethane, a refrigerant
 R32: Contact with acids liberates very toxic gas, a risk phrase
 Small nucleolar RNA R32/R81/Z41